"No Bystanders" (stylized in all caps) is a song by American rapper Travis Scott from his third studio album Astroworld (2018). It features additional vocals from American rappers Juice Wrld and Sheck Wes. The song interpolates the song "Tear da Club Up" by Three 6 Mafia.

Background
In an interview with Rolling Stone, Scott's A&R Sickamore spoke about the song's reference to "Tear da Club Up":

That's all Travis. He wanted the ultimate raging song. All he thought about that song was mosh pits. All the music we think about how it’s going to perform live. You always gotta think about that. Is it still gonna be a movie live? We did that song last night at Hard Summer — oh my God. It was one of the top songs of the night. There were huge mosh pits going crazy.Travis Scott has also used the phrase "No Bystanders" at his concerts to encourage people to "mosh out", dance and "rage".

Composition
Lyrically, the song is about how Travis Scott does not want people who do not party (referring to them as "bystanders") at his concerts, as well as his lifestyle. Juice Wrld sings the intro of the song ("The party never ends / In a motel, laying with my sins, yeah / I'm tryna get revenge / You'll be all out of love in the end"). In the chorus, Sheck Wes interpolates the chorus of "Tear da Club Up", chanting "Fuck the club up", and adds his "Bitch!" ad-lib as well.

Critical reception
The song was praised by critics for its energetic and "explosive" style, and has been considered suitable for moshing and wild partying at concerts. Conversely, Ben Dandridge-Lemco, in his review of Astroworld for The Fader, wrote that Scott's collaboration with Sheck Wes and Juice Wrld "would seem like an obvious opportunity for him to run the table and show out", but "Instead, in the middle of an awkward skittering flow, he delivers the album's worst line: 'I told her it's B.Y.O.B., that mean buy your own booze.'"

Live performances
Travis Scott performed the song at the 61st Annual Grammy Awards.

Controversy
In April 2019, DJ Paul of Three 6 Mafia filed a $20 million lawsuit against Travis Scott for copyright infringement in the song, also pointing out that in his Grammys performance, Scott changed the lyrics to "tear the club up" instead of "fuck the club up." The lawsuit was settled in September 2019.

Charts

Certifications

References

2018 songs
Travis Scott songs
Songs written by Travis Scott
Songs written by Juice Wrld
Songs written by WondaGurl
Songs written by Mike Dean (record producer)
Songs written by TM88
Songs written by Cyhi the Prynce
Songs written by Björk
Songs with lyrics by Sjón
Songs written by Juicy J
Song recordings produced by Mike Dean (record producer)
Juice Wrld songs
Sheck Wes songs